Elise Van Truyen (born 13 April 1906, date of death unknown) was a Belgian sprinter. In 1924 she participated at the 1924 Women's Olympiad where she won gold medal in the high jump event. She competed in the women's 4 × 100 metres relay at the 1928 Summer Olympics.

References

1906 births
Year of death missing
Athletes (track and field) at the 1928 Summer Olympics
Belgian female sprinters
Belgian female high jumpers
Olympic athletes of Belgium
Place of birth missing
Women's World Games medalists